Atticus Dean Mitchell (born 1993) is a Canadian actor and musician. He is best known for his roles as Benny Weir in the television film My Babysitter's a Vampire and series of the same name, and Gabe in the film Radio Rebel.

Early life
Mitchell was born in Toronto, Ontario. He graduated from Malvern Collegiate Institute in Toronto.

Career

Acting
Mitchell began his acting career in 2009 with a recurring role in the YTV series How to be Indie in which he played the role of Carlos Martinelli in eight episodes during the first season and two more during the second season. He played the starring role of Benny Weir in television film and series My Babysitter's a Vampire and was nominated for a 2011 Gemini award for his performance in the  film. In 2012, he starred as Gabe in the Disney Channel television film Radio Rebel. In 2013 he guest starred in two episodes of Hard Rock Medical, portrayed Graydon in a post-apocalyptic film, The Colony, and also co-starred as Wookie in a Disney XD Canada/Family Channel original movie, Bunks.

Music
Mitchell is a drummer in a band called The Fishwives that plays local shows in Toronto.

Filmography

Awards and nominations

References

External links

Canadian male child actors
Canadian male film actors
Canadian male television actors
Living people
Male actors from Toronto
1993 births
21st-century Canadian male actors